Paragolsinda obscura is a species of beetle in the family Cerambycidae. It was described by Masaki Matsushita in 1933. It is known from Taiwan.

References

Mesosini
Beetles described in 1933